The Shubert Theatre was a 2,100-seat show house that opened in 1972 at 2020 Avenue of the Stars, Century City, California. The theatre was demolished in October 2002 to make way for the 2000 Avenue of the Stars office building. The Shubert opened on July 22, 1972, with a production of Follies directed by Harold Prince and Michael Bennett. Other notable productions included A Chorus Line, Les Misérables, Cats, Evita, Sunset Boulevard, Dreamgirls, Ragtime, and Beauty and the Beast and the 1990 Miss Universe pageant.

On November 4, 2001, eleven months before its demolition, the theatre served as a one-off venue for the 2001 Primetime Emmy Awards when the event lost its scheduled venue, the Shrine Auditorium, due to postponement following the September 11 attacks. It had previously hosted the awards in 1973 and 1976.

The theatre closed in January 2002 due to a lack of bookings for the 2002 season and was demolished in October 2002 to make way for an office complex.

References

External links
 

Buildings and structures demolished in 2002
Demolished theatres in Los Angeles
Shubert Organization
Theatres completed in 1972